The National People's Congress Ethnic Affairs Committee is one of ten special committees of the National People's Congress, the national legislature of the People's Republic of China. The special committee was created during the first session of the 1st National People's Congress in September 1954, and has existed for every National People's Congress except the 4th National People's Congress, during which it was suspended due to the Cultural Revolution.

Chairpersons

References

See also 
 United Front Work Department
 State Ethnic Affairs Commission

Ethnic Affairs Committee
Ethnicity in politics